Held for Ransom may refer to:

 Held for Ransom (2020 film), a film awarded with the Political Film Society Award for Human Rights 2020
 Held for Ransom (2000 film), an American film directed by Lee Stanley
 Held for Ransom (1938 film), an American film directed by Clarence Bricker
 Held for Ransom (1913 film), an American film directed by Oscar Apfel
 Adventures of Sherlock Holmes; or, Held for Ransom, a 1905 American film directed by J. Stuart Blackton